Wilhelm Franz Josef Kosch (2 October 1879 – 20 December 1960) was an Austrian historian of literature and theatre and lexicographer.

Born in Drahany in Moravia, Kosch died in Vienna in 1960 at age 81.

Publications 
 A. Stifter. Festschrift, 1905
 Martin Greif in seinen Werken, 1907
 Die Deutschen in Österreich und ihr Ausgleich mit den Tschechen, 1909
 Menschen und Bücher. Essays 1912
 Melchior Diepenbruck, 1913
 Das deutsche Theater und Drama (im 19. Jahrhundert) seit Schillers Tod, Vier Quellen Verlag, Leipzig (1913)
 M. Sailer, 1914
 Martin von Cochem, 1915
 Feldmarschall Graf Radetzky, 1915
 J. von Eichendorff, 1923
 Das katholische Deutschland, (A–S), 1933, (1938)
  in her letters to Adalbert Stifter. Der Wächter Verlag, Nymwegen 1940 and 1948.

Publisher
 Deutsches Literatur-Lexikon. Biographisches und bibliographisches Handbuch I (1949) – 4 (1958); 2nd edition 1947–1958; 3rd edition 1966
 Das katholische Deutschland (A – Schlüter), 1933–1938
  Biographisches Staatshandbuch 1–2, 1963
 Deutsches Theater-Lexikon (A – Rostok), 1953–1966; Revision by Ingrid Bigler-Marschall, 2013.

Bibliography 
 : Biographisches Lexikon zur Geschichte der böhmischen Länder. on behalf of the Collegium Carolinum e.V. Vol.II, Oldenbourg, Munich 1984,  with further references.
 Supplement to vol. I, Biographisches Lexikon zur Geschichte der böhmischen Länder, 1979, Bibliography and data supplements: Kosch, Wilhelm.
 
 Jaksch: Bohemia 4. Oktober 1929.

References

External links 
 
 Wilhelm Kosch on Münzinger Biographie
 Wilhelm Kosch on ZVAB
 W. Kosch on Deutsche Biographie
 Wilhelm Kosch's main works

1879 births
1960 deaths
Germanists
Lexicographers
Theatrologists
20th-century lexicographers
Austrian literary historians
Academic staff of Radboud University Nijmegen
People from Prostějov District
Moravian-German people
Austrian people of Moravian-German descent